Nanchang–Jingdezhen–Huangshan high-speed railway is a high-speed railway currently under construction in China. It is expected to open in 2023.

History
Construction began on 25 December 2018.

Stations
Nanchang East
Junshanhu
Yugan
Poyang South
Leping North (reserved)
Jingdezhen North (interchange with the Jiujiang–Quzhou railway)
Yaoli
Qimen South
Yixian East
Huangshan North

References

High-speed railway lines in China
High-speed railway lines under construction